Michel-Emmanuel Rodocanachi (1821 - 1901) was an influential Greek trader and banker of London.

Rodocanachi's parents were wealthy merchants in their home at Chios, related to the influential Vlasto and Mavrogordato families. They escaped the Chios massacre, settling in Marseilles where they rebuilt their shipping and trading business as Rodocanachi Sons & Co. 
Recognising the importance of having a presence on the London market, in 1830 they sent their son Michael there to cover their interests and work with other family members who traded grain in Odessa, St Petersburg, Italy and Marseille.  In 1853 he returned to Marseilles to marry Ariadne Michael Petrocochino.

In London he obtained membership of the Baltic Exchange and, assisted by other members of the Greek diaspora, notably the Ralli Brothers, he bought ships to transport the grain that he traded, and developed a property portfolio, including the Royal Automobile Club Buildings Co.

This financial foundation enabled him to participate in the founding of the Imperial Bank with fellow Anglo-Greeks Petrocochino and Schilizzi. When the Imperial bank was acquired by the London Joint Stock Bank, his eldest son Emmanuel Michael Rodocanachi (1855–1932) became a director of that bank, in addition to the other family companies.

Michel was an active member of the Greek Orthodox community in London, and raised money for the construction of St Sophia’s Cathedral there. He moved to Worthing in his later years as his health failed, calling his house Chios. However he died in London and is buried, with his son Emmanuel, in West Norwood Cemetery.

Rodocanachi Sons & Co. did not survive long after Emmanuel's retirement in 1925; it collapsed in the Great Depression as a result of bad debts due from failed German and Italian trading partners.

Sources 
 Stuart Thompstone 'Rodocanachi, Michael Emmanuel' Oxford Dictionary of National Biography (subscription)
 Christopher Long, Rodocanachi Family of Chios
 The Times Rodocanachi Sons & Co 27 Nov 1929 & 2 Sep 1933

1821 births
1901 deaths
Members of the Ecumenical Patriarchate of Constantinople
Eastern Orthodox Christians from Greece
Greek businesspeople in shipping
Burials at West Norwood Cemetery
19th-century Greek businesspeople
British businesspeople
Eastern Orthodox Christians from the United Kingdom
Greek emigrants to England
Businesspeople from Chios
19th-century British businesspeople